Plum Creek Christian Church is a church located in Rushville, Indiana. The church has a membership of 175, and a Sunday school enrollment of 200.

History 
Plum Creek Christian Church was established in December 1833 by a group of Christians. A little over a decade later, in 1844 or 1845, a church building was constructed near Shawnee Creek, about two miles from the original location. In 1874 a new location was sought, which resulted in the purchasing and conversion of an old Methodist church frame building.

References 

Buildings and structures in Rush County, Indiana
1833 establishments in Indiana